The canton of Astarac-Gimone is an administrative division of the Gers department, southwestern France. It was created at the French canton reorganisation which came into effect in March 2015. Its seat is in Masseube.

It consists of the following communes:
 
Arrouède
Aujan-Mournède
Aurimont
Aussos
Bédéchan
Bellegarde
Bézues-Bajon
Boulaur
Cabas-Loumassès
Castelnau-Barbarens
Chélan
Cuélas
Esclassan-Labastide
Faget-Abbatial
Labarthe
Lalanne-Arqué
Lamaguère
Lartigue
Lourties-Monbrun
Manent-Montané
Masseube
Meilhan
Monbardon
Moncorneil-Grazan
Monferran-Plavès
Monlaur-Bernet
Mont-d'Astarac
Monties
Panassac
Ponsan-Soubiran
Pouy-Loubrin
Saint-Arroman
Saint-Blancard
Saint-Martin-Gimois
Samaran
Saramon
Sarcos
Seissan
Sémézies-Cachan
Sère
Tachoires
Tirent-Pontéjac
Traversères

References

Cantons of Gers